Main Frame Software Communications (also known as Main Frame India) is an Indian dubbing studio group in India, with their main studio located in Sitadevi, Temple Road of Mumbai. Both live and animated television series and films have been dubbed in Hindi and regional languages such as Tamil, Telugu, Marathi, Gujarati, Punjabi and certain other languages, but also in English as well.

Founded in 2000, by Eliza Lewis during her tenure at UTV, she had the opportunity to work on building onto the entire dubbing studio division of UTV and begun to dub project works for Discovery, Walt Disney, Nickelodeon, Warner Bros. and 20th Century Fox associated with this studio  are highly experienced personnel in their area of expertise. They have also been involved in original animation casting and voice directions of several productions created in India.

This dubbing studio was responsible for dubbing all the Harry Potter films in Hindi. The firm who were working at UTV did some of the earliest dubbing in Hindi, starting with the film Disney's Aladdin and Baby's Day Out, before this company was found and started dubbing on its own route.

Dubbing work

Live action films

A list of all the Live Action films that the company has dubbed.

Animated films

A list of all the Animated films that the company has dubbed.

Television animation

A list of all the animated television programs that this studio has dubbed.

Live action television

A list of all the live action television programs that this studio has dubbed.

List of voice actors

This is a list of voice actors that are currently employed for this dubbing studio and/or have contributed to films being dubbed by this studio, and the language that they use. Both Male artists and Female voice actors are listed.

Male voice actors

Female voice actresses

See also
Eliza Lewis
Dubbing (filmmaking)
List of Indian dubbing artists

References

External links
Official Website 
Official Website 

Entertainment companies of India
Indian dubbing studios
Companies established in 2000
Companies based in Mumbai
Entertainment companies established in 2000
Software companies established in 2000
2000 establishments in Maharashtra